Phalonidia chlaenites is a species of moth of the family Tortricidae. It is found in Minas Gerais, Brazil.

The wingspan is about 9 mm. The ground colour of the forewings is creamy ochreous, but paler creamy in the distal half of the wing. The costa is suffused brownish, with some concolorous dots in the median area. The markings are yellowish brown. The hindwings are brown.

References

Moths described in 2002
Phalonidia